Lachezar Tanev (born 1 October 1963) is a retired Bulgarian football midfielder. Tanev has been a licensed FIFA players agent since 1995.

Tanev played club football for Spartak Pleven and PFC CSKA Sofia in the Bulgarian A PFG. He also had a spell with G.D. Chaves in the Portuguese Liga.

Tanev made 25 appearances for the Bulgaria national football team.

References

External links

Tanev Agency website

1963 births
Living people
Sportspeople from Pleven
Bulgarian footballers
Bulgaria international footballers
PFC Spartak Pleven players
PFC CSKA Sofia players
FC Lokomotiv 1929 Sofia players
G.D. Chaves players
First Professional Football League (Bulgaria) players
Bulgarian expatriates in Portugal
Bulgarian expatriate sportspeople in Spain

Association football midfielders